Michael Tranzo Hawkes (born April 11, 1977) is a former American football linebacker in the National Football League for the Carolina Panthers. He also was a member of the Scottish Claymores in the World League of American Football. He played college football at Virginia Tech.

Early years
Hawkes attended Nottoway High School in Nottoway County, Virginia. As a senior, he was a starter at linebacker, receiving region and district Defensive Player of the Year honors. He also was named All-Group AA at tight end.

He accepted a football scholarship from Virginia Tech. As a redshirt freshman, he made 4 tackles. As a sophomore, he had 20 tackles. As a junior, he started 11 games, posting 79 tackles, 5.5 sacks and 3 interceptions. 

As a senior, he started every game, registering 69 tackles, 3 sacks and 2 interceptions, while contributing to the team reaching the National Championship Game in the 2000 Sugar Bowl.

Professional career

Carolina Panthers
Hawkes was signed as an undrafted free agent by the Carolina Panthers after the 2000 NFL Draft on April 26. He was waived before the start of the season and signed to the practice squad, where he remained for the first 15 weeks. On December 19, he was promoted to the active roster. He played in the season finale against the Oakland Raiders.

In 2001, he was cut before the start of the season and signed to the practice squad on September 4. On October 12, he was promoted to the active roster. He played in 2 games before being released on October 24, tpo make room for linebacker Darren Hambrick.

St. Louis Rams
On January 19, 2002, he was signed by the St. Louis Rams. On February 12, he was allocated to the Scottish Claymores of the World League of American Football. He was named the starter at middle linebacker for the Claymores, while recording 10 starts, 43 tackles (second on the team), one sack, 3 passes defensed and one fumble recovery. He was released by the Rams before the start of the season.

Dallas Cowboys
On January 7, 2003, he was signed as a free agent by the Dallas Cowboys. He was released on August 31.

References

External links
Just Sports Stats

Living people
1977 births
People from Nottoway County, Virginia
Players of American football from Virginia
American football linebackers
Virginia Tech Hokies football players
Carolina Panthers players
Scottish Claymores players